Lebenya Nkoka (born October 19, 1982) is a Mosotho long-distance runner. He competed in the men's marathon at the 2016 Summer Olympics.

International competitions

Personal Bests

References

External links

Living people
1982 births
Lesotho male long-distance runners
Lesotho male marathon runners
Olympic athletes of Lesotho
Athletes (track and field) at the 2016 Summer Olympics
Commonwealth Games competitors for Lesotho
Athletes (track and field) at the 2006 Commonwealth Games
Athletes (track and field) at the 2022 Commonwealth Games